Kämpersvik is a coastal smaller locality in Tanum Municipality, Bohuslän, Sweden. It has a population of 60 inhabitants and is located 5 kilometres south of the town of Grebbestad, to the west of the road leading to Fjällbacka.

References

External links
 Tanum Municipality's heritage pages on Kämpersvik 
 Ejgdetjarnet.se, scheme to restore local wetland area 

Populated places in Västra Götaland County